Lipslide is the debut solo album from Saint Etienne lead singer Sarah Cracknell.  The album was co-produced by Cracknell and a variety of producers and released in the UK by Gut Records in 1997.  Upon its release Lipslide earned favorable reviews from music critics, although it was not a commercial success.  Musically the album does not stray too far from Cracknell's work with Saint Etienne, as it contains electronic and indie-styled pop music.

Lipslide was not released in the United States until 2000.  Licensed to Instinct Records, the album's cover art and track list were altered – four tracks were removed and replaced by four new songs.  Additionally, the song "Home" was presented in a different mix.  These four missing songs and the original version of "Home" were later included on the Kelly's Locker EP, released in 2000 by Instinct.

"Anymore" was released as a single in the UK prior to the album, peaking at number thirty-nine in the UK Singles Chart in 1996. "Desert Baby" was also released but did not chart.

Track listing

CD: Gut Records (UK version)

CD: InsideOut Records (Japanese version)
The Japanese edition intersperses "Downtown", "Empire State High", "Oh Boy, The Feeling When You Held My Hand", "Fifth Floor", "Aussie Soap Girl" and alternate version of "Taxi" into the UK running order.

CD: Virgin Records (European version)
The European edition inserts "Empire State High" as track 10, but is otherwise identical to the UK edition.

Enhanced CD: Instinct Records (US version) (2000)
The US edition drops half of the UK tracks, intersperses "Oh Boy, The Feeling When You Held My Hand", "Aussie Soap Girl", "4 Months, 2 Weeks" and "Fifth Floor".
The original recording of "Home" is replaced with a new mix.
The enhanced portion of the disc includes the music video of "Anymore".
The length is 53 minutes.

2xCD deluxe edition: Heavenly Records (UK & Europe) (2012)
Disc one features the original album with a slightly shuffled running order.
"Penthouse Girl, Basement Boy" is absent and the US mix of "Home" appears on disc one with the UK original on the bonus disc.
Disc two includes most of the songs found on the Japanese and US editions. 8 of the bonus tracks were previously unreleased.

References

1997 debut albums
Sarah Cracknell albums
EMI Music Japan albums
Gut Records albums
Instinct Records albums
Virgin Records albums
Albums produced by Stephen Hague
Albums produced by Warne Livesey